Luca Pandolfi (born 14 March 1998) is an Italian footballer who plays as a forward for  club Juve Stabia on loan from Cosenza.

Career

Arezzo
In January 2020, Pandolfi moved to Arezzo of Serie C. He made his league debut for the club on 9 February 2020, coming on as a 79th-minute substitute for Niccolò Belloni in a 1-1 draw with Como.

Turris
On 1 September 2020, he signed a 2-year contract with Turris, recently promoted into Serie C. On 1 February 2021, he was loaned to Serie B club Brescia.

Cosenza
On 31 August 2021, he moved to Cosenza on a three-year contract.

On 29 July 2022, Pandolfi moved to Juve Stabia on loan with an option to buy.

References

External links

1996 births
Living people
A.S. Melfi players
U.S. Alessandria Calcio 1912 players
S.S. Arezzo players
Brescia Calcio players
Cosenza Calcio players
S.S. Juve Stabia players
Serie C players
Serie B players
Italian footballers
Association football forwards